Dettingen an der Iller is a town in the district of Biberach in Baden-Württemberg in Germany, located on the Iller river. At the end of 2015 its population was approximately 2100.

References

Biberach (district)
Württemberg